Reina Washio (鷲尾伶菜; Washio Reina, born January 20, 1994) is a Japanese singer, performer and model. She is a former member of J-Pop group E-girls and former member of Flower.

For her solo activities she uses the stage name Rei (伶). Washio is represented with LDH.

Early life 
Reina Washio was born on January 20, 1994, in Karatsu, Saga Prefecture, Japan. Since kindergarten, she had the dream of becoming a singer. However, she did not have the confidence to sing in public and was a shy child. A changing point in her life was attending a concert from Exile at Fukuoka Dome with her mother. Washio was so impressed by their performance that after learning an EXPG (a talent school run by LDH) would open in Fukuoka, she started attending it in her first year of high school. To be able to pay the fees of EXPG Fukuoka, she worked a part-time job in Karatsu. Washio dropped out from school after her first year of high school to focus on becoming a singer. Besides Exile, Japanese singer JUJU was another big musical influence during her childhood.

Career 
In 2011, after attending EXPG Fukuoka for two years, Washio participated in the EXILE Presents VOCAL BATTLE AUDITION 3 ~For Girls~ in the vocal section. On July 26, during an E-Girls SHOW event in SHIBUYA-AX, it was revealed that she was one of the winners of the VOCAL BATTLE AUDITION 3 and was added to Flower as a vocalist. On that same day, she was also announced as a new member of E-girls, having a concurrent position between the group and Flower. On October 12, 2011, Washio made her debut with Flower with the single "Still".

In September 2015 she made her debut as a model in the November issue of the Japanese fashion magazine LARME. In the same year, she made her first appearance as a voice actress in the anime series Kindaichi Shonen Case Book R - Bloodless Murder Case -.

On September 20, 2019, with the announcement of Flower's disbandment set for the end of that month, Washio revealed that she would approach her new goal of solo activities while being member of E-girls. On December 22, with the announcement of E-girls' disbandment set for around the end of 2020, it was revealed that Washio would be making her solo debut.

On January 31, 2020, it was announced that she would be singing the theme song of the movie Shousetsu no Kamisama / The God of Novels, titled "Call Me Sick", and an insert song of the soundtrack titled "Konna Sekai ni Shita no wa Dare da". It was also revealed that she would be using the stage name Rei (伶) for her solo activities.

On April 13, 2022, she released her first solo album called "Just Wanna Sing."

Personal life 
Washio has a close friendship with singer MACO and the combination of the two is called Washimaco (わしまこ). They collaborated on the song "Dear My Friend" which was released in June 2018.

Washio is also an enthusiastic gamer. She often plays cooperative video games such as Fortnite and Call of Duty together with Sandaime J Soul Brothers' Elly, The Rampage from Exile Tribe's Takahide Suzuki and Ballistik Boyz from Exile Tribe's Ryusei Kainuma. In June 2019 she traveled to California alongside Elly to participate as a guest player in the Fortnite Summer Block Party, a Pro-Am gaming tournament. There, she teamed up with BELL of Japanese pro-gaming team CRAZY Raccoon.

Discography

Singles

Albums

Participating work

Lyrics

Tie-up

Filmography

Voice acting

Internet TV

Radio

Music videos

Live

Events

Other work 

 Hizen, Saga support member "Hizen saga FAN" (2018)

Notes

References

External links 
 伶 OFFICIAL WEBSITE
 鷲尾伶菜 (@reina.washio.official) on Instagram
 伶 (@rei__official_) on Twitter

Japanese women singer-songwriters
LDH (company) artists
1994 births
Living people
People from Saga Prefecture
21st-century Japanese women singers
21st-century Japanese singers